Hole Land is an arcade fixed shooter developed by a Tecfri and released in Japan in 1984.

Gameplay

Player controls a multi-colored robot able to move to right and left, jump and shoot enemies such as small humanoids, rats, ghosts and snakes that come from holes above on the screen, vertically far away from the player, who stands always at the bottom of the stage and has to eliminate them all before they reach the bottom or simply avoid them to complete each level. Enemies are able to attack the player with bombs, making him unable to jump, move and shoot for a short time. The player can also become defenseless getting hit by incoming rocks from vulcans. A life is lost when enemies touch the player and take away the robot's lower half, which can be avoided by jumping over them without touching them.

The game has three stages. In the first two, each time the robot is damaged by rocks and bombs, a friendly, short, old man appears to help fix it.

At the last part of the third one, the player faces off the game's boss: a grotesque giant monster with a ball-shaped body and an enormous mouth with pointed teeth. The goal is to shoot and destroy all of its teeth before it can reaches the player's position, otherwise the monster will devour the robot. If the player manages to win the boss, he is returned to the first stage.

References

1984 video games
Arcade video games
Arcade-only video games
Tecfri games
Fixed shooters
Video games developed in Spain